Wilde-Donald Guerrier (born 31 March 1989) is a Haitian professional footballer who played as a left winger or left-back for Azerbaijan Premier League club Zira and the Haiti national team. He has played abroad in Poland, Turkey, Azerbaijan and Cyprus.

Club career

Haiti
Guerrier started his career in Haiti for Violette AC. After being relegated to the second division, Guerrier decided to leave the club for a first division team, which led him to América des Cayes.

Qarabağ
On 6 July 2017, Guerrier signed a two-year contract with Qarabağ FK.

Guerrier appeared in all of Qarabağ's six 2017–18 Champions League qualifiers, as they became the first team from Azerbaijan to reach the group stage of the competition.

On 16 July 2019, Guerrier left Qarabağ.

Neftçi PFK
On 5 September 2019, Guerrier signed a one-year contract with Neftçi PFK. On 1 June 2020, Neftçi announced that Guerrier had left the club after his contract expired.

Return to Qarabağ
On 2 July 2020, Qarabağ announced the return of Guerrier from Neftçi. On 31 January 2021, Guerrier left Qarabağ by mutual consent.

Later career
In November 2021 Guerrier joined Wieczysta Kraków of the IV Liga, the Polish fifth tier, joining up with Franciszek Smuda, his former manager at Wisła Kraków. He signed a contract until the end of the season with the option for a further season.

Olympiakos Nicosia
In August 2022 he signed a one-year contract with Cypriot top-tier club Olympiakos Nicosia.

Zira
On 29 January 2023, Zira announced the signing of Guerrier to a six-month contract, with the option of an additional year, from Olympiakos Nicosia.

Career statistics

Club

International goals

Scores and results list Haiti's goal tally first, score column indicates score after each Guerrier goal.

Honors
Individual
 CONCACAF Best XI: 2017

References

External links
 
 

1989 births
Living people
People from Sud (department)
Naturalized citizens of Poland
Haitian footballers
Association football wingers
Association football fullbacks
Haiti international footballers
Ligue Haïtienne players
Ekstraklasa players
Süper Lig players
Azerbaijan Premier League players
Cypriot First Division players
Violette AC players
Wisła Kraków players
Alanyaspor footballers
Qarabağ FK players
Neftçi PFK players
Apollon Limassol FC players
Olympiakos Nicosia players
Wieczysta Kraków players
Haitian expatriate footballers
Haitian expatriate sportspeople in Poland
Expatriate footballers in Poland
Haitian expatriate sportspeople in Turkey
Expatriate footballers in Turkey
Haitian expatriate sportspeople in Azerbaijan
Expatriate footballers in Azerbaijan
Haitian expatriate sportspeople in Cyprus
Expatriate footballers in Cyprus